Vanash may refer to:

Vanash-e Bala
Vanash-e Pain